This page is a comprehensive discography of American folk musician John Denver.  Denver had four number one hits on the U.S. Billboard Hot 100 singles chart, all achieved between 1973 and 1975: "Sunshine on My Shoulders," "Annie's Song," "Thank God I'm a Country Boy" and "I'm Sorry."  Three of his albums were also number one sellers: "Back Home Again," "Windsong" and "John Denver's Greatest Hits," again all released between 1973 and 1975.

Denver's studio albums categories list separately his early albums with the Mitchell Trio, and then his own studio albums by decade, live albums, Christmas albums, and compilation albums. These charts also include their certifications for sales data.  His singles are arranged by decade and include several specialty categories — among them his Christmas singles, his single from his collaboration album with Plácido Domingo, and his single from his collaboration as a guest performer with the Nitty Gritty Dirt Band. The charts are inclusive of their peak positions by country of sale.

Studio albums

With the Mitchell Trio

1960s albums

1970s albums

1980s albums

1990s albums

Live albums

Christmas albums

Compilation albums

Collaboration albums

Singles

1960s and 1970s

1980s-2010s

Other singles

Christmas singles

Singles from collaboration albums

Guest singles

Charted B-sides

Notes

A^ John Denver also peaked at number 7 on the RPM Country Albums chart in Canada.
B^ B-side "Calypso", see charted B-side listing below.

References

External links

Country music discographies
Discography
Discographies of American artists